Iddaru Mitrulu is a 1999 Indian Telugu-language drama film which was directed by K. Raghavendra Rao. This film stars Chiranjeevi, Sakshi Sivanand and Ramya Krishna. The film was released on 30 April 1999 to positive reviews. It was dubbed into Tamil as  Singanadai .

Plot 
Vijay (Chiranjeevi) and Anita (Sakshi Sivanand) are best friends. They share their thoughts, happiness, and pain with each other. One day Anita finds love in a photographer, Prakash (Suresh) and marries him, while Vijay plays a lover boy and marries Shanti (Ramya Krishna). However, Anita's happiness ends when she finds out that her husband is two-timing her. Vijay consoles her but his wife is unhappy that he spends so much time with her and gives him an ultimatum. He chooses his friend and takes care of her and her unborn child and later reunites her with her husband. Anita wants to see her friend in a happy state as well and reunites him with Shanti. The film ends on a happy note, with the happy couples holding the newborn baby.

Cast
Chiranjeevi as Vijay
Sakshi Sivanand as Anita
Ramya Krishna as Shanti
Suresh as Prakash
 Sudhakar as Harishchandra a.k.a. Hari
 Chandra Mohan as Ranga Rao, Vijay's father
 Mallikarjuna Rao as Vijay's Cook
 AVS as Navala Subba Rao, Shanti's Father
 Y. Vijaya as Shanti's Mother
 Brahmanandam as Titanic, Shanti's Bodyguard
 Subbaraya Sharma
 Rambha for Cameo appearance in song, Rukku Rukku

Soundtrack
The music for this film was composed by Manisharma. The audio was a huge hit and all the songs were chartbusters. All the tracks were massive hits, especially the tracks "Hey Rukku" featuring Rambha, "Nootokka Jillalo" gained much mass attention due to heavy dance steps. The track "Bangaram Techhi" sung by K. S. Chithra and Partha Sarathi was critically acclaimed due to the emotional rendition provided by Chitra in the song suiting the situation in the movie.

References

External links

1990s Telugu-language films
1999 films
Films directed by K. Raghavendra Rao
Films scored by Mani Sharma